Roseland Plantation is a historic plantation complex site in Faunsdale, Alabama.   The site is situated on a low hill at the end of a long driveway on the overgrown estate. It was added to the National Register of Historic Places on January 20, 1994, as a part of the Plantation Houses of the Alabama Canebrake and Their Associated Outbuildings Multiple Property Submission.

History
Roseland Plantation was the longtime home of Samuel Alston Fitts.  He was born on May 15, 1815, in Warren County, North Carolina, the eldest son of James Harris Fitts and Rebecca Emily Alston.  James Fitts had established Roseland as a  plantation in the Canebrake region of Marengo County during the late 1820s, but was murdered by a discharged overseer on July 16, 1832.  His death left Samuel, at the age of eighteen, in charge of caring for his mother and eight brothers and sisters.

Samuel Fitts married Sarah Elizabeth Alston of neighboring Clarke County on November 29, 1838.  Her parents were William Williams Alston and Mary Haywood Burges, also originally from North Carolina.  Fitts had made the plantation a success by 1860, with property valued at $95,000.  By this point Roseland was worked by at least 67 slaves.

Architecture
The plantation house at Roseland Plantation began as a dogtrot house in 1835. A large two-story Greek Revival-style frame addition was added to the front of the dogtrot in the mid-1850s.  The former front porch of the dogtrot became a cross-hall and the breezeway of the dogtrot was extended into a very long center-hall in the new construction.  The upper floor was accessed from the central hallway via a reverse staircase.

The main house and most of the outbuildings have been demolished by neglect, but the largely undisturbed site remains important for archaeological reasons.  A dairy cooler and the original log kitchen do remain at the site.  A survey done in 1993, prior to its nomination to the National Register, indicated that the main house was in ruins with only a few walls remaining.

At the time of the survey a small Greek Revival plantation office had already been removed to another location.  Known as the "apothecary", it was used for dispensing medicine to the plantation's slaves.  The property owners gave it to the Sturdivant Museum Association and it was moved to the grounds of Sturdivant Hall in Selma in order to ensure its preservation.  A large seven-seat privy at Roseland, dating from the 1850s, was also donated to the Sturdivant Museum Association in 1979, but was not relocated to Sturdivant Hall until 2005.

References

National Register of Historic Places in Marengo County, Alabama
Houses on the National Register of Historic Places in Alabama
Greek Revival houses in Alabama
Houses completed in 1835
Houses completed in 1850
Plantation houses in Alabama
Dogtrot architecture in Alabama
Houses in Marengo County, Alabama
Demolished buildings and structures in Alabama
Demolished but still listed on the National Register of Historic Places
Plantations in Alabama
1835 establishments in Alabama